Le Pic des ténèbres  is a Belgian novel by Roger Leloup. It was first published in 1989.

Notes

1989 novels
Belgian speculative fiction novels
French-language novels